Kalamunda railway station was a major station on the Upper Darling Range Railway in Western Australia serving the town of Kalamunda.  It was known earlier as Stirk's Landing and was located at a distance 20 miles from Perth.

History
When the Upper Darling Range Railway opened in July 1891, Kalamunda was the only station on the line with raised platforms. It had two station buildings, a water tower and sidings for passing trains and for storing wagons. In 1926, a new station building was built.

The station closed on 22 July 1949, along with the rest of the line. The station has been redeveloped as the Kalamunda History Village.

References

External links

Disused railway stations in Western Australia
Kalamunda, Western Australia
Railway stations in Australia opened in 1891
Railway stations closed in 1949